Richard Peter Vande Hoef (May 15, 1925 – December 20, 2020) was an American politician in the state of Iowa. Vande Hoef was born in Boyden, Iowa, in May 1925. He was a veteran of World War II, serving in the United States Army and worked as a farmer. He served in the 2nd District of the Iowa State Senate from 1981 to 1993, and House of Representatives from 1993 to 1999, as a Republican. Vande Hoef died in December 2020 in Sibley, Iowa, at the age of 95.

References

1925 births
2020 deaths
Farmers from Iowa
Republican Party Iowa state senators
Republican Party members of the Iowa House of Representatives
People from Boyden, Iowa
Military personnel from Iowa
United States Army personnel of World War II